Qeshlaq-e Zeynal Kandi (also Romanized as Qeshlāq-e Zeynāl Kandī) is a village in Mokriyan-e Shomali Rural District, in the Central District of Miandoab County, West Azerbaijan Province, Iran. At the 2006 census, its population was 114, in 27 families.

References 

Populated places in Miandoab County